Erin Smith may refer to:
 Erin Smith (musician)
 Erin Smith (entrepreneur)
 Erin Smith (bowls)
 Erin Elizabeth Smith, American poet, editor, publisher, and educator